Arispejal astisaró is an album that was recorded by Esplendor Geométrico at Chon Studio Palma (Majorca), mixed at Al-Majriti Studio in Melilla, and digitalized and mastered for CD in Bochum (Germany).

Track listing
 Jari (Fellow) – 6:25
 Malos tratos (Ill-treatments) – 5:02 - video link
 Rabúa aromía (Twisted Latin woman) - 5:53
 Felación (Suck) - 6:00
 Arispejal astisaró (Powerful metal) – 4:28
 Bi bajín (Without respect) – 7:45
 Es inaudito (It’s unheard-of) – 5:26
 Ampuchao (Harassed) – 3:57
 Cataré (At one fell swoop) – 6:07
 Nu decotora (It tears me) – 6:24

References

Notes
 In memorial to the nomad nations
 The contents of this record (sounds & lyrics) may provoke moral shock; if not, pump up the volume!
 Cover: Design inspired on Malwiya minaret in Samarra (Iraq).
 Original titles are in Caló (Spanish Romani), Riff (Berber), or Spanish, with English translation.

1993 albums
Esplendor Geométrico albums